A number of steamships were named Hadiotis, including – 

, a Greek cargo ship in service 1925–29
, a Greek cargo ship in service 1929–41
, a Greek liberty ship in service 1947–65

Ship names